Anchieta may refer to:

People
 José de Anchieta, S.J. (1534-1597), a Catholic saint, Jesuit missionary, writer, poet and apostle of Brazil, or the following places and things
 José Alberto de Oliveira Anchieta (1832–1897), Portuguese explorer and zoologist
 Juan de Anchieta (sculptor) (1540-1588), Spanish sculptor
 Juan de Anchieta (1462–1523), Spanish composer

Places
 Anchieta Island, in the northern coast of the state of São Paulo, Brazil, famous as the site of a state prison
 Anchieta, Espírito Santo, a municipality (formerly known as Reritiba) in the state of Espírito Santo, Brazil
 Anchieta, Rio de Janeiro, a suburb in northern Rio de Janeiro city, Brazil
 Anchieta, Rio Grande do Sul, a neighborhood in Porto Alegre, Brazil
 Anchieta, Santa Catarina, a municipality in the state of Santa Catarina, Brazil
 Rodovia Anchieta, or the Anchieta Highway, running between São Paulo and Santos, Brazil
 Anchieta Palace, in Vitória, Brazil

Other
 Fundação Padre Anchieta, educational TV and radio stations of the state of São Paulo